The Flow is an album by Chris Leslie released in 1997.

This album is mostly instrumental. Although Chris Leslie is best known for his fiddle playing in Fairport Convention, these cuts sound nothing like Fairport or any of his other prior musical projects. The album demonstrates Leslie's breadth of musicality, influence and inspiration from across the globe.

Tracks 2 and 6 produced by Simon Mayor. Other tracks produced by Tim Healey.

Recorded by Mark Tucker.

Track listing 
 "Ballydesmond/ Scartaglen" (Traditional)
 "Eliz Iza/ Derobee de Guingamp" (Traditional / Traditional)
 "Aignish" (Traditional)
 "The Witch of the Glen" (Traditional)
 "Believe Me, If All Those Endearing Young Charms" (Words: Thomas Moore; Tune: Traditional)
 "Lime Rock" (Traditional)
 "The Old Blackbird" (Traditional)
 "The Flow" (Chris Leslie)
 "Niel Gow's Lament for Abercairney" (Niel Gow)
 "Paddy Ryan's Dream/ The Inimitable Reel/ The Macroom Lassies" (Traditional)
 "Kishmul's Galley" (Traditional)
 "Tune for the Land of Snows" (Chris Leslie)

Personnel 
 Chris Leslie - violins, tingshaws, singing bowl, electric tambura
 Maartin Allcock - acoustic guitar, electric guitar
 Simon Mayor - mandola, mandocello, mandolin
 Margaret Knight - concert harp
 Anne-Marie Doyle - Irish step-dancing
 Martin Simpson - acoustic guitar
 Ric Sanders - electric violin, viola, cello

References

Chris Leslie (folk musician) albums
1997 debut albums